Improvisations is a 1962 LP album by Ravi Shankar. The opening piece is based on music from Shankar's score for Satyajit Ray's 1955 movie Pather Panchali with flutist Bud Shank playing in Indian style. Shankar composed "Fire Night" influenced by the 1961 Los Angeles fires and the song features jazz musicians Shank (flute) and Gary Peacock (bass) improvising over Indian percussion instruments. The concluding ragas are in classical Indian style: the first raga, Kirvani, with South Indian origin, and the second, Rageshri, with North Indian origin. The album was released in CD format by Angel Records in 1999 and has been described as a "visionary recording" by AllMusic reviewer Heather Phares.

Track listing
"Improvisation on the Theme Music from Pather Panchali" – 7:07
"Fire Night" – 4:37
"Karnataki (Raga Kirvani)" – 6:43
"Raga Rageshri: Part 1 (Alap)" – 6:50
"Raga Rageshri: Part 2 (Jor)" – 11:01
"Raga Rageshri: Part 3 (Gat)" – 3:24

References

1962 albums
Ravi Shankar albums
World Pacific Records albums
Angel Records albums
Albums produced by Richard Bock (producer)